This is a list of members of the Western Australian Legislative Council from 22 May 1962 to 21 May 1965.

Significant changes occurred to the structure of the Legislative Council and the manner of voting during the term. The Constitution Acts Amendment Act (No.2) 1963 (No.72 of 1963) abolished the 10 three-member provinces which had existed almost unaltered since 1900, and created 15 new two-member provinces. Voting became compulsory and the property franchise was abolished, and the practice of having separate Legislative Council elections in May of every even-numbered year was abolished—the Council's members would now go to the voters at the same elections as members of the Legislative Assembly, although the rotational system where one member per province would retire at each election remained in effect, and unlike the Assembly, the Council's term still expired on 22 May every three years.

A number of transitional arrangements were necessary to put these changes into effect. Those who had terms expiring on 21 May 1964, and five of the ten whose terms were to expire on 21 May 1966 (those who had the lowest winning margins at the 1960 election) would retire on 21 May 1965. The remaining 15 members were eligible to be appointed to new provinces for terms expiring on 21 May 1968. Five of the 15 members whose terms expired in 1965 opted to retire—George Bennetts (Labor), Anthony Loton (Country), Reg Mattiske (Liberal), James Murray (Liberal) and John Teahan (Labor).

Notes
 On 1 May 1963, North-East Province Labor MLC William Hall died. Labor candidate David Dellar won the resulting by-election on 29 June 1963.
 On 10 April 1963, West Province Labor MLC Evan Davies died. Labor candidate Jerry Dolan won the resulting by-election on 29 June 1963.
 On 12 June 1963, Midland Province Country MLC Charles Simpson died. Liberal candidate Jack Heitman won the resulting by-election on 17 August 1963.

Sources
  (especially p. 6)
 
 

Members of Western Australian parliaments by term